MKL/myocardin-like protein 2 is a protein that in humans is encoded by the MKL2 gene.

Members of the myocardin family bind to the transcription factor serum response factor (SRF) and act as coactivators controlling genes of relevance for myogenic differentiation, motile function  and addiction.

References

Further reading